Josh Brooks (born May 28, 1980) is an American university sports administrator who currently serves as athletic director at the University of Georgia. He was previously the athletic director for Millsaps College.

Early years and education
Josh Brooks was born on May 28, 1980, in Hammond, Louisiana. He graduated from LSU with a degree in kinesiology and completed his master's degree in sports management at Georgia.

Athletic Director

Millsaps College
After stints at Louisiana-Monroe and Georgia, Brooks became the athletic director at Millsaps College, a Division III school located in Jackson, Mississippi.

University of Georgia
In 2016, Brooks went to the University of Georgia to serve as executive associate director of athletics. Over the course of the next 5 years, Brooks was promoted three times. In 2018, Brooks became a deputy athletic director, and in 2019 became the senior deputy athletic director. In 2021, following the departure of Greg McGarity, Brooks became the athletic director for the University of Georgia.

Personal life
Brooks is married to his wife, Lillie, and they have three sons together: James, Jackson, and Davis.

References

External links
 Georgia Bulldogs bio

Living people
Georgia Bulldogs and Lady Bulldogs athletic directors
Louisiana State University people
Millsaps Majors athletic directors
1980 births